The 2018 presidential campaign of Geraldo Alckmin was announced on 9 December 2017 at a national convention of the Brazilian Social Democracy Party (PSDB). Geraldo Alckmin was the 35th Governor of São Paulo from 2011 to his resignation in 2018. He had previously served as the 31st Governor, from 2001 to 2006. This is Alckmin's second bid for the presidency, his first being in 2006, when he lost to incumbent president Luiz Inácio Lula da Silva.

After Manaus mayor Arthur Virgílio Neto dropped out as pre-candidate for president on 23 February 2018, Alckmin became the PSDB's presumptive nominee for president. He was officially nominated on 4 August 2018, with Progressive Party Senator Ana Amélia as his running mate. Alckmin's campaign has secured a coalition with eight parties: DEM, PP, PR, PRB, SD, PTB, PSD and PPS

On the first round of the election on 7 October 2018, Alckmin finished fourth in the race, receiving about 4.8% of the vote. This was the worst performance for a PSDB presidential nominee in history.

Program 
As candidate, Alckmin has proposed a smaller government and reduction of taxes, and has defended the labor reform that took place in the administration of President Michel Temer.

Candidates

Election result

Presidential elections

References

2018 Brazilian general election
2018 Brazilian presidential campaigns
2018 presidential campaigns